Clarington is an unincorporated community in the township of Barnett, in Forest County, Pennsylvania, United States. Clarington had a post office until it closed on February 20, 2004; it still has its own ZIP code, 15828.

References

Unincorporated communities in Forest County, Pennsylvania
Unincorporated communities in Pennsylvania